

Winners 
Most Awards

See also 
National Film Awards

References

External links
 http://www.keralafilm.com
 Kerala State Award - A Review

Kerala State Film Awards
2013 Indian film awards